Xiaguanying may refer to one of the following towns in China:

 Xiaguanying, Lanzhou, a town of Yuzhong County, Lanzhou, Gansu
 Xiaguanying, Qian'an, a town of Qian'an, Tangshan, Hebei